Lost and Found on a South Sea Island is a 1923 American drama film directed by Raoul Walsh and produced by Samuel Goldwyn. It was filmed on location in Tahiti and includes a nude scene involving a young woman bathing.

Plot
Captain Blackbird meets the beautiful Lorna on the island of Pago Pago. However, Lorna is promised to the evil Chief Waki. She and her lover Lloyd Warren beg the captain for help, but he refuses.

Cast

Preservation
One reel survives, according to a recent biography of Walsh. However, the Italian archive Cineteca Del Friuli, in Gemona, is said to have a full print.

See also
List of rediscovered film footage

References

External links

Lost and Found on a South Sea Island at SilentEra

Lost and Found on a South Sea Island at Virtual History
Lantern slide to the film (retrieved from Wayback Machine)
Southseascinema.org

1923 films
Films directed by Raoul Walsh
1923 drama films
American silent feature films
American black-and-white films
Goldwyn Pictures films
Films shot in Tahiti
Films set in American Samoa
Silent American drama films
1920s rediscovered films
Rediscovered American films
1920s American films